{{DISPLAYTITLE:15-hydroxyprostaglandin-D dehydrogenase (NADP+)}}

In enzymology, a 15-hydroxyprostaglandin-D dehydrogenase (NADP+) is an enzyme that catalyzes the chemical reaction

(5Z,13E)-(15S)-9alpha,15-dihydroxy-11-oxoprosta-5,13-dienoate + NADP+  (5Z,13E)-9alpha-hydroxy-11,15-dioxoprosta-5,13-dienoate + NADPH + H+

Thus, the two substrates of this enzyme are (5Z,13E)-(15S)-9alpha,15-dihydroxy-11-oxoprosta-5,13-dienoate and NADP+, whereas its 3 products are (5Z,13E)-9alpha-hydroxy-11,15-dioxoprosta-5,13-dienoate, NADPH, and H+.

This enzyme belongs to the family of oxidoreductases, specifically those acting on the CH-OH group of donor with NAD+ or NADP+ as acceptor. The systematic name of this enzyme class is (5Z,13E)-(15S)-9alpha,15-dihydroxy-11-oxoprosta-5,13-dienoate:NADP+ 15-oxidoreductase. Other names in common use include prostaglandin-D 15-dehydrogenase (NADP+), dehydrogenase, prostaglandin D2, NADP+-PGD2 dehydrogenase, dehydrogenase, 15-hydroxyprostaglandin (nicotinamide adenine, dinucleotide phosphate), 15-hydroxy PGD2 dehydrogenase, 15-hydroxyprostaglandin dehydrogenase (NADP+), NADP+-dependent 15-hydroxyprostaglandin dehydrogenase, prostaglandin D2 dehydrogenase, NADP+-linked 15-hydroxyprostaglandin dehydrogenase, NADP+-specific 15-hydroxyprostaglandin dehydrogenase, NADP+-linked prostaglandin D2 dehydrogenase, and 15-hydroxyprostaglandin-D dehydrogenase (NADP+). This enzyme participates in arachidonic acid metabolism.

References

 

EC 1.1.1
NADPH-dependent enzymes
Enzymes of unknown structure